Hokkaidō Gokoku Shrine (北海道護国神社, Hokkaidō Gokoku jinja) is a Shinto shrine located in Asahikawa, Hokkaido at 1 Chome-2282-2 Hanasakicho, Asahikawa, Hokkaido 070-0901. It was established in 1902, and enshrines Raijin (雷電大神), Sarutahiko Ōkami (猿田彦大神), and other kami.

See also
List of Shinto shrines in Hokkaidō

External links
Official website
Hokkaido Shinto listing

Shinto shrines in Hokkaido